Edward Howard "Howie" Hansen (September 5, 1925 – April 11, 1952) was a Canadian football player who played for the Edmonton Eskimos of the Canadian Football League (CFL). He previously played football at the University of California, Los Angeles. He was married to LaVon Hinkson, who died in 1950. He died in 1952.

References

1925 births
1952 deaths
American football ends
Canadian football ends
American players of Canadian football
UCLA Bruins football players
Edmonton Elks players
Players of American football from Utah
Sportspeople from Logan, Utah